Burry Port Harbour is a former industrial harbour which mainly served the coal industry, on the Loughor estuary (Moryd Llwchwr). It is now converted into a marina. The town of Burry Port grew around the harbour.

Origins
The town of Burry Port dates from the nineteenth century although the neighbouring village of Pembrey has a history dating back to the medieval period. From the late eighteenth century, the development of small collieries in the area led to the building of a network of canals and then tramways to carry coal from inland mines to the sea. The first of these canals was built by Thomas Kymer and reached the sea at Kidwelly and another was built in 1798 by the Earl of Ashburnham to serve his collieries. Harbour facilities remained basic until Pembrey Harbour was opened in 1819. However, the fairly rapid growth of coal mining in the years following the end of the Napoleonic Wars in 1815 resulted in it not being large enough to serve the needs of the mine owners of the Gwendraeth Valley. As a result, with the backing of the Pemberton family and other local landowners an Act of Parliament was secured in 1825 to form the Pembrey New Harbour Company. This became known as Burry Port Harbour before it was completed.

Early history
The new harbour opened in 1832 although the harbour walls collapsed soon after leading to a delay in its full operation. It provided a means to transport coal produced in the Gwendraeth Valley out to sea, although it still depended on a complex pattern of inland canals and tramways. Those who invested in the development of  the harbour believed that its location offered considerable potential for expansion, as it had an advantage over neighbouring Llanelli Harbour in that vessels did not need to navigate the narrow channel along the Loughor estuary. In June 1838, John H. Browne, clerk to the Burry Port Harbour Company, wrote to the Cambrian newspaper drawing attention to the advantages after an article on port facilities in the South Wales Coalfield failed to refer to Burry Port. Three years later, in 1841, an account of the potential development of the anthracite coalfield to provide fuel for steamships highlighted the potential of Burry Port Harbour to accommodate larger ships than could progress through the narrow channel to the larger port at Llanelli.

Nineteenth-century developments
The town of Burry Port did not exist at this time. The earliest records of the town springing up around the new docks adjacent to Pembrey appear around 1850. The importance of the newly emerging town increased when the railways reached Burry Port. The station serving both Pembrey and the new town of Burry Port was built a few hundred yards down from Pembrey at Burry Port.

The canal network was now unable to handle the loads from the Gwendraeth valley mines and part of the canal network was converted into the Burry Port and Gwendraeth Valley Railway by the late 1860s with the port continuing to grow in importance and shipping volumes. It did not, however, achieve the levels of trade that many had anticipated and went into gradual decline in the twentieth century.

References

Ports and harbours of Wales